CEPT may refer to:

 CEPT University (Centre for Environmental Planning and Technology University), an academic institution located in Ahmedabad, India
 European Conference of Postal and Telecommunications Administrations, coordinating body for European state telecommunications and postal organizations
 CEPT Recommendation T/CD 06-01, 1981 European Conference standard for display of videotex
 Common Effective Preferential Tariff, an ASEAN tariff and trade scheme